Corelle is a brand of glassware and dishware. It is made of Vitrelle, a  tempered glass product consisting of two types of glass laminated into three layers. It was introduced by Corning Glass Works in 1970, but is now manufactured and sold by Corelle Brands.

Patterns 
Corelle dishware has come in many different patterns over the years since it was first introduced, but most of these were retired when Corning divested itself of the Corning Consumer Products Company. Many of the patterns were also used in CorningWare cookware.  Retired patterns are still widely available.

References 

Glass trademarks and brands
Kitchenware brands
Products introduced in 1970
Corning Inc.